Low Level Owl: Volume I is the third full-length album release from Lawrence, Kansas-based band the Appleseed Cast.

Vulture.com listed "On Reflection" as number 84 of the 100 greatest emo songs.

Track listing
"The Waking of Pertelotte" – 2:02
"On Reflection" – 6:26
"Blind Man's Arrow" – 3:38
"Flowers Falling from Dying Hands" – 3:28
"Messenger" – 0:46
"Doors Lead to Questions" – 2:53
"Steps and Numbers" – 5:54
"Sentence" – 2:57
"Bird of Paradise" – 2:24
"Mile Marker" – 4:02
"Convict" – 6:02
"A Tree for Trials" – 1:28
"Signal" – 3:11
"View of a Burning City" – 7:52

References

External links
Low Level Owl Volume I at Deep Elm Records

2001 albums
The Appleseed Cast albums
Albums produced by Ed Rose
Deep Elm Records albums